Johannes Nambala (born 15 February 1991) is a Paralympian athlete from Namibia competing mainly in category T13 sprint events. In 2013 he became the first Namibian to win a gold medal at an IPC Athletics World Championships, when he won the 400m sprint in Lyon. As well as World Championship success Nambala has also won two silver Paralympic medals, both silver, and both won at the 2016 Summer Paralympics in Rio de Janeiro.

Personal history
Nambala was born in 1991 in the village of Iikokola, in the Uukwaluudhi District of Namibia. He was born with a congenital complication that left him visually impaired; though he is not blind. Nambala now lives in Windhoek, and was educated at Windhoek Technical High School.

Athletics career
Nambala took up athletics in 2012 whilst in South Africa. Training out of Oshakati Athletics Sports Club he was classified as a T13 competitor for visually impaired athletes. He made his senior debut in 2013 and that year he was selected for the Namibia team and travelled to Lyon to compete at the 2013 IPC Athletics World Championships. There he competed in three events, winning a silver in the 200 metres and became the first Namibian athlete to win an IPC World Athletics gold when he broke the championship record to take 400 metres title.

In the buildup to the 2016 Summer Paralympics in Rio de Janeiro, Nambala took part in the 2015 IPC Athletics World Championships in Doha. He took another two World Championship medals, a bronze in the 400 metres, despite posting a faster time than won him the title two years prior, and a gold in the 200 metres. He followed the World Championships with his first African Games, competing in the 400 metres. His time of 48.49 was enough to beat his nearest rival, Algeria's Abdelatif Baka, to claim the gold medal. The next year, at the Rio Paralympics, Nambala entered three events, the 100 metre (T13), the 200 metre (T13) and the 4 x 100 metre relay (T11-13) He won two medals, placing second in both the T13 100m sprint and the T13 400m sprint.

References

External links 
 

1991 births
Living people
Namibian male sprinters
Paralympic athletes of Namibia
Paralympic silver medalists for Namibia
Paralympic bronze medalists for Namibia
Athletes (track and field) at the 2016 Summer Paralympics
Athletes (track and field) at the 2020 Summer Paralympics
Medalists at the 2016 Summer Paralympics
Medalists at the 2020 Summer Paralympics
African Games gold medalists for Namibia
African Games medalists in athletics (track and field)
Athletes (track and field) at the 2015 African Games
World Para Athletics Championships winners
Paralympic medalists in athletics (track and field)